Persian Surgery Dervishes is a recording of two live solo electric organ concerts, the first held in Los Angeles on 18 April 1971 and the second in Paris on 24 May 1972, by the avant-garde minimalist composer Terry Riley, following his A Rainbow in Curved Air and In C. The two very different performances of the same composition "Persian Surgery Dervishes" are meant to show the importance of improvisation in Riley's music. Riley plays a modified Yamaha electric organ tuned in just intonation.

The original double-record version was released by the French label Shandar. It was republished, first by Mantra Records, then by Dunya Records. There existed also a single-record version, also on Shandar, containing just the Paris concert, which had been sponsored by the label itself.

Parts of this album served as soundtrack for a French film released in 1973, La chute d'un corps, directed by the French columnist Michel Polac.

Track listing

References

External links
 

Terry Riley albums
1972 live albums